Scurria scurra is a species of sea snail, a true limpet, a marine gastropod mollusk in the family Lottiidae, one of the families of true limpets.

Description

Distribution
Southeast Pacific and Southwest Atlantic: Chile, Argentina and Falkland Islands.

References

Lottiidae
Gastropods described in 1841
Taxa named by René Lesson